The 1999 CGU National League season was a 45 over English county cricket competition; colloquially known as the Sunday League, it featured many mid-week floodlit matches. For the first time, it was contested through two divisions: Division One and Division Two. Each team played all the others in their division both home and away. The top three teams from Division Two were promoted to the first division for the 2000 season, while the bottom three sides from Division One were relegated. From this season, the counties had nicknames.

Lancashire Lightning won the League for a record fifth time, retaining the title they had won the previous season. Warwickshire Bears, Hampshire Hawks and Essex Eagles were relegated from Division One, while Sussex Sharks, Somerset Sabres and Northamptonshire Steelbacks were promoted from Division Two.

Teams

Standings
 Pos = Position, Pld = Played, W = Wins, T = Ties, L = Losses, NR = No Results, A = Abandonments, Pts = Points.
 Points awarded: W = 4, L = 0, T = 2, NR = 2, A = 2

Division One

Division Two

Statistics

Division One

Most runs

Most wickets

Division Two

Most runs

Most wickets

References

CGU
Pro40